Stuart Armstrong Walker (March 4, 1888 - March 13, 1941) was an American producer and director in theatre and motion pictures.

Biography

Stuart Walker was born March 4, 1888, in Augusta, Kentucky, the son of Cliff Stuart Walker and Matilda Taliaferro Armstrong Walker. After attending public school in Cincinnati and graduating from the University of Cincinnati, he went to work for David Belasco and made his debut as an actor in 1909. He became a play reader for Belasco, and directed plays including The Governor's Lady (1912). In 1914 Walker joined Jessie Bonstelle as a director in Detroit and Buffalo.

In 1915, Walker organized the Portmanteau Theatre, an independent repertory theatre company. He produced seasons in Baltimore, Chicago, Cincinnati, Dayton, Indianapolis, Louisville and New York City. He staged the first dramatization of Booth Tarkington's bestselling novel Seventeen, presented on Broadway in 1918 starring Gregory Kelly and his future wife, newcomer Ruth Gordon.
 
Walker's repertory company was active throughout the 1920s. Its credits include the first American performance of Alberto Casella's supernatural drama Death Takes a Holiday, adapted by Walter Ferris, in 1929.

In 1930, Walker became a screenwriter in Hollywood, and served as dialogue director on films including Brothers and The Last of the Lone Wolf. He directed his first feature film the following year, and in 1936 he became a producer for Paramount Pictures.

Walker died March 13, 1941, at his home in Beverly Hills, California, following a heart attack.

Filmography

Director

Producer

References

External links 

 
 
 

1888 births
1941 deaths
American male actors
American theatre directors
American dramatists and playwrights
Filmmakers from California
People from Augusta, Kentucky
American theatre managers and producers
Film directors from Kentucky
Film producers from Kentucky